Isaac Taylor (1787–1865) was an English philosophical and historical writer, artist, and inventor.

Isaac Taylor may also refer to:
Isaac Taylor (engraver) (1730–1807), English engraver, father of Isaac Taylor (1759–1829)
Isaac Taylor (1759–1829), English engraver and writer, father of Isaac Taylor (1787–1865)
Isaac Taylor (priest) (1829–1901), English philologist, toponymist, and Anglican canon of York, son of the writer
Isaac H. Taylor (1840–1936), U.S. Representative from Ohio
Isaac M. Taylor (1921–1996), American physician and academic
Isaac S. Taylor (1850–1917), American architect in the midwestern United States